"A Christmas Carol" is the December 23, 1954 episode of the hour-long American television anthology variety series, Shower of Stars. The episode is an adaptation of Charles Dickens' 1843 novella of the same name.

Shower of Stars had a four-season run from 1954 to 1958 on CBS, alternating every fourth week with the dramatic anthology series Climax!. It was also one of the few American TV productions of the time telecast in the UK, in 1956. Unusually for the time, it was presented on film and in color. Only a black-and-white print of this episode seems to have survived, and it has been released on DVD. The commercials seen live during the program have also survived. The program is introduced on kinescope by host William Lundigan.

The production boasted a script and lyrics by noted American playwright Maxwell Anderson, and a score by Bernard Herrmann. Fredric March, in his only known portrayal of the role, starred as Ebenezer Scrooge, and Basil Rathbone portrayed Marley's Ghost.

The production featured few songs, but those it did feature forced the adapters to severely condense the story, especially the final third. Rather than having a Ghost of Christmas Yet to Come, the adaptation featured a mynah bird, who leads Scrooge to a graveyard in which he sees not only his own grave, but that of Tiny Tim.

The script added an unusual twist to the story in having the Ghost of Christmas Past (Sally Fraser) and the Ghost of Christmas Present (Ray Middleton) be portrayed by the same actors who played Scrooge's sweetheart Belle and his nephew Fred, respectively, and Scrooge not only notices the resemblance, but mistakes the Ghost of Christmas Present for his nephew.

Cast
Fredric March as Scrooge
Basil Rathbone as Marley's Ghost
Ray Middleton as Fred and the Ghost of Christmas Present
Bob Sweeney as Bob Cratchit
Christopher Cook as Tiny Tim
Sally Fraser as Belle and the Ghost of Christmas Past
Craig Hill as Young Scrooge
Queenie Leonard as Mrs. Cratchit
Rex Evans as Solicitor
Tony Pennington as His Companion
William Griffiths as The Book Buyer
Peter Miles as Peter Cratchit
Janine Perreau as Belinda Cratchit
Bonnie and Judy Franklin as Susan and Martha Cratchit
June Ellis as The Housekeeper
Dick Elliott as Fezziwig (uncredited)

See also
 Adaptations of A Christmas Carol

References

External links

1954 American television episodes
Musicals based on A Christmas Carol
Television shows based on A Christmas Carol
1954 musicals